Torje Wichne (born 12 May 1997) is a Norwegian footballer who plays as a defender for Jerv.

Career
On 3 April 2022, he made his Eliteserien debut for Jerv in a 1–0 win against Strømsgodset.

Personal life
He was born at Rikshospitalet as a part of quadruplets, all boys. They grew up in Mandal. His brothers Amund and Eirik also became footballers.

References

External links

1997 births
Living people
People from Mandal, Norway
Norwegian footballers
Mandalskameratene players
Flekkerøy IL players
FK Jerv players
Norwegian Third Division players
Norwegian Second Division players
Norwegian First Division players
Eliteserien players
Association football defenders
Twin sportspeople
Norwegian twins
Quadruplets
Sportspeople from Agder